Mount Cronus is a majestic, conical, partially snow-covered peak,  high, rising  south of Amundsen Bay and  west-southwest of Reference Peak. It was sighted by an Australian National Antarctic Research Expeditions party in October 1956 and named for Cronus, the father of the gods in classical mythology.

References 

Mountains of Enderby Land